is a train station located in Ōmuta, Fukuoka.

Lines 
Nishi-Nippon Railroad
Tenjin Ōmuta Line

Platforms

Adjacent stations

Surrounding area
 Ichibayamashita Post Office
 Higashihara Obstetrics And Gynecology Clinic
 Masumi Coffee
 Gooday Kuranaga
 Ninomiya Clinic
 Japan National Route 208

Railway stations in Fukuoka Prefecture
Railway stations in Japan opened in 1938